Reena Bharat Dabhi (born 24 March 1994) is a Gujarati Cricketer. She plays for Saurashtra and West Zone. She has played 3 First-class matches, 29 Limited over matches and 28 Women's Twenty20.

References 

1994 births
Living people
Saurashtra women cricketers
West Zone women cricketers
People from Gujarat